Edrick Eduardo Menjívar Jonhnson (born 1 March 1993) is a Honduran professional footballer who plays as a goalkeeper for Olimpia in the Liga Nacional de Fútbol Profesional de Honduras.

On 21 November 2018 Menjivar made his senior debut for the Honduras national team against Chile.

Honors

Honduras
 CONCACAF Nations League third place: 2021

References

External links

1993 births
Living people
Honduran footballers
C.D. Olimpia players
Liga Nacional de Fútbol Profesional de Honduras players
Honduras international footballers
Association football goalkeepers
2021 CONCACAF Gold Cup players